Pirate Cinema is a novel by Cory Doctorow. It was released in October 2012. The novel is licensed under the terms of Creative Commons BY-NC-ND license and is available free on the author's website.

The novel is set in a dystopian near-future Britain where the government is effectively controlled by media corporations. The main character, Trent McCauley, has had his internet access cut for reassembling downloaded films on his computer and, living rough on the streets of London, is trying to fight the introduction of a new draconian copyright law.

Pirate Cinema won the 2013 Prometheus Award.

The US hardcover is 384 pages long.

This book was also featured as an e-book in the Humble eBook Bundle. The bundle raised more than $1.2 million, with customers paying an average amount of $14.29 for the bundle.

References

Further reading 

 
 
 
 
 
 
 
 
 
 
 
 
 
 
 
 
 
 
 
 
 
 
 
 
 
 
  Excerpt at https://craphound.com/pc/2012/10/01/pc-booklist/
 
 
 
 http://lfs.org/blog/artistic-liberty-internet-freedom-downloading-state-surveillance-copyright-and-government-control-an-appreciation-of-cory-doctorows-pirate-cinema-the-2013-prometheus-award-winner-for-be/
 https://www.overthinkingit.com/2012/10/31/pirate-cinema-cory-doctorow/
 https://www.readme.lk/pirate-cinema-beautiful/

External links 
Official Book Page on Cory Doctorow's website
Online Version of the book

2012 Canadian novels
Creative Commons-licensed novels
Novels by Cory Doctorow
Tor Books books